Daniela Arelis Uribe Caro, better known as Arelis Uribe (born Santiago de Chile, 1987), is a Chilean author. She worked for the presidential campaign of Beatriz Sánchez in the 2017 national election. As a writer, she is best known for her debut collection of short stories Quiltras. In 2016 she won the Santiago en 100 palabras Award for her story "Lionel".

References

21st-century Chilean short story writers
1987 births
Living people
Chilean women short story writers
21st-century Chilean women writers